is a Japanese professional shogi player ranked 6-dan. Nishikawa's father Kenji was also a professional shogi player.

Early life
Nishiyama was born on April 2, 1986, in Kobe, Japan. Although his father Keiji was a professional shogi player, he only really became interested in shogi when he was a first grade elementary school student after reading a beginner's book written by shogi professional .  Nishiyama was accepted into the  Japan Shogi Association's apprentice school at the rank of 6-kyū as a student of his father in 2001, promoted to the rank of 1-dan in 1995, and obtained full professional status and the rank of 4-dan in October 2008 after finishing the 43rd 3-dan League (April 2008September 2008) with a record of 14 wins and 4 losses.

Nishiyama and his father are the sixth father-son pair to become professional shogi players and the only pair since the end of World War II.

Promotion history
The promotion history for Nishikawa is as follows:
 6-kyū: September 2001
 4-dan: October 1, 2008
 5-dan: August 21, 2014
 6-dan: November 10, 2016

References

External links
ShogiHub: Professional Player Info · Nishikawa, Kazuhiro

Japanese shogi players
Living people
Professional shogi players
People from Kobe
Professional shogi players from Hyōgo Prefecture
1986 births